Suri Rural District is a rural district (dehestan) in the Suri District of Rumeshkhan County, Lorestan Province, Iran. At the 2006 census, it had 8,194 inhabitants living in 1715 households.  The rural district has ten villages:
 Azizabad
 Asadabad
 Chogha Sabz-e Khoda Nazar
 Moradabad
 Nasarkhasiabad
 Ramavandi-ye Sofla
 Sefid Khani-ye Jadid
 Shiravand
 Towhid Suri
 Vali-ye Asr

Notes and references 

Rumeshkhan County
Rural Districts of Lorestan Province